The Kawasaki AR80K, also called Ninja 80RR in Malaysia, Micro Magnum in Thailand, is a motorcycle manufactured between 1992 and 1998, by Kawasaki Motorcycle & Engine Company, a division of Kawasaki Heavy Industries. The bike was released in two different types, one is air-cooled, which was mainly sold in UK and Japan, and the other one is the liquid-cooled which were released mainly in South East Asian markets, although a model was also put on sale on South American countries (Argentina & Uruguay) as the AR-80 Magnum Liquid Cooled and  ultimately leading to another AR variant, the AR-100RR, the AR-100RR was also sold on Malaysia, contrary to popular belief that the AR was still in production up to the year model 2003, this is not true, as they are just simply left over from dealerships. While the air-cooled models were released in various countries worldwide. The Kawasaki KSR-80 II (only sold in Japan) also shares the same engine format.

See also 
 Kawasaki Ninja series

References 
 :ja:カワサキ・AR Previous post reference. Used translator to transfer in English.

AR80K
Motorcycles introduced in 1992
Two-stroke motorcycles
Standard motorcycles